Ratagan (Ràtagan in Scottish Gaelic) is a small hamlet on the southwestern shore of the sea loch, Loch Duich in Lochalsh, Scottish Highlands and is in the Scottish council area of Highland.
The Ratagan Youth Hostel is located along Loch Duich.

Populated places in Lochalsh